Senator Austin may refer to:

Henry W. Austin (1864–1947), Illinois State Senate
Jonathan L. Austin (1748–1826), Massachusetts State Senate
Warren Austin (1877–1962), U.S. Senator from Vermont from 1931 to 1946
William H. Austin (1859–1922), Wisconsin State Senate
William Austin (American writer) (1778–1841), Massachusetts State Senate